The canton of Baume-les-Dames is an administrative division of the Doubs department, eastern France. Its borders were modified at the French canton reorganisation which came into effect in March 2015. Its seat is in Baume-les-Dames.

It consists of the following communes:
 
Abbenans
Adam-lès-Passavant
Aïssey
Autechaux
Avilley
Battenans-les-Mines
Baume-les-Dames
Blarians
Bonnal
Bonnay
Bouclans
Breconchaux
La Bretenière
Bretigney-Notre-Dame
Cendrey
Champlive
Châtillon-Guyotte
Chevroz
Corcelle-Mieslot
Côtebrune
Cubrial
Cubry
Cusance
Cuse-et-Adrisans
Cussey-sur-l'Ognon
Dammartin-les-Templiers
Devecey
L'Écouvotte
Esnans
Flagey-Rigney
Fontenelle-Montby
Fontenotte
Fourbanne
Geneuille
Germondans
Glamondans
Gondenans-Montby
Gondenans-les-Moulins
Gonsans
Gouhelans
Grosbois
Guillon-les-Bains
Huanne-Montmartin
Hyèvre-Magny
Hyèvre-Paroisse
Laissey
Lomont-sur-Crête
Luxiol
Mérey-Vieilley
Mésandans
Moncey
Mondon
Montagney-Servigney
Montivernage
Montussaint
Naisey-les-Granges
Nans
Ollans
Osse
Ougney-Douvot
Palise
Passavant
Pont-les-Moulins
Pouligney-Lusans
Puessans
Le Puy
Rigney
Rignosot
Rillans
Rognon
Romain
Rougemont
Rougemontot
Roulans
Saint-Hilaire
Saint-Juan
Séchin
Silley-Bléfond
Tallans
Thurey-le-Mont
La Tour-de-Sçay
Tournans
Tressandans
Trouvans
Uzelle
Val-de-Roulans
Valleroy
Venise
Vennans
Vergranne
Verne
Vieilley
Viéthorey
Villers-Grélot
Villers-Saint-Martin
Voillans

References

Cantons of Doubs